Ozyptila salustri is a crab spider species found in Tuscany, Italy.

References

External links 

salustri
Fauna of Italy
Spiders of Europe
Spiders described in 2011